The September 9, 1961, race at Road America 500 was the twelfth racing event of the eleventh season of the Sports Car Club of America's 1961 Championship Racing Series. 
		
SCCA National Road America Results [AP+BP+CP]

References

External links
RacingSportsCars.com
World Sports Racing Prototypes
Dick Lang Racing History

Road America 500
Road America 500
1961 in sports in Wisconsin